Cheshmeh Chai-ye Olya (also Romanized as Cheshmeh Chāī-ye ‘Olyā; also known as Cheshmeh Chāhī-ye ‘Olyā) is a village in Karezan Rural District, Karezan District, Sirvan County, Ilam Province, Iran. At the 2006 census, its population was 15, in 4 families. The village is populated by Kurds.

References 

Populated places in Sirvan County
Kurdish settlements in Ilam Province